Supreme Ruler: Cold War was developed by BattleGoat Studios and was announced August 19, 2010 by Paradox Interactive at the 2010 Gamescom video gaming convention held in Cologne, Germany and released on July 19, 2011. It is set during the Cold War Era from the end of World War II to the early 1990s. The main Campaign allows the player to be the head of either the U.S. or the USSR, while the Sandbox game mode can be played from any nation's point of view.

Development 

This is BattleGoat's third title in the Supreme Ruler series, following future-based titles Supreme Ruler 2010 (published in 2005) and Supreme Ruler 2020 (published in 2008).  The gameplay features a new sophisticated Sphere of Influence system, as well as the usual military, economic and diplomatic simulation of the previous games.

Features 

Listed gameplay features:

 Play as the United States or Soviet Union in Campaign Mode
 Control any Nation in Post-World War II Era in Sandbox Mode
 Use Diplomacy, Trade and Espionage to influence the policies of other nations
 Research new Technologies to give your nation an edge
 Grow and Modernize your Economy
 Control Military production and deployment, or let your Ministers take care of the details
 And when Diplomacy Fails… Sophisticated Real-Time Strategic and Tactical Control of your Military Forces!
 Enhanced Graphics and Sound including New 3D Terrain
 Experience the redesigned GUI with improved On-Map feedback and streamlined controls
 Up to 16 players in Multiplayer over local network or Internet

References 

2011 video games
MacOS games
Windows games
Government simulation video games
Grand strategy video games
Cold War video games
Video games developed in Canada
Multiplayer and single-player video games
Supreme Ruler
Paradox Interactive games